The Waverly Wonders is an American sitcom starring Joe Namath that aired Fridays at 8:00 pm on NBC from September 7 to October 6, 1978.

Premise
Conceived as a vehicle for Namath (who had retired from the Los Angeles Rams after the 1977 NFL season), the show focused on the misadventures of Joe Casey, a washed-up professional basketball player who now taught history at Waverly High School (in Eastville, Wisconsin) and coached the school's basketball team, the Waverly Wonders.

Casey wasn't much of a teacher (he knew nothing about history) and his team wasn't much on the court (they hadn't won a game in three years); about the only decent player they had was a girl, Connie (Kim Lankford). Other "Wonders" included Tate (Charles Bloom), Faguzzi (Joshua Greenrock) and Parks (Tierre Turner). Ben Piazza co-starred as stodgy former coach George Benton, who served as a foil to Casey.

Cast
 Joe Namath as Joe Casey
 Kim Lankford as Connie Rafkin
 Charles Bloom as John Tate
 Joshua Greenrock as Tony Faguzzi 
 James Staley as Alan Kerner  
 Tierre Turner as Hasty Parks
 Gwynne Gilford as Linda Harris
 Ben Piazza as George Benton

Episode list

Ratings
Up against Donny and Marie on ABC and Wonder Woman on CBS, The Waverly Wonders drew poor ratings. A total of nine episodes were produced.  However, only three were shown from September 22 through October 6, 1978.  Less than two months after The Waverly Wonders failed, a new show with a similar premise -- The White Shadow—started its three-year run as a 60-minute comedy-drama on CBS. Meanwhile, at NBC, its time slot was replaced by a more successful TV series, Diff'rent Strokes, which in its first year, got to Number 27 of 114 prime time shows that year.

Namath never starred in another TV series, although he did do guest spots on such programs as The Love Boat and Fantasy Island.

Larry Hagman was originally offered the role of Joe Casey, but instead chose to play J.R. Ewing on Dallas.

References

External links

1978 American television series debuts
1978 American television series endings
1970s American high school television series
1970s American sitcoms
1970s American workplace comedy television series
Basketball television series
NBC original programming
Television series about educators
Television series by Lorimar Television
Television shows set in Wisconsin